Mr. Brahmachari is a 2003 Indian Malayalam-language comedy drama film directed by Thulasidas and written by J. Pallassery from a story by Mahesh Mithra. It was produced and distributed by M. Mani through the company Aroma Movie International. The film stars Mohanlal in the lead role, with Meena, Nedumudi Venu, Jagathi Sreekumar, Jagadish, Kaviyoor Ponnamma and K.R Vijaya in supporting roles. The film released on 3 March 2003, and turned out to be a box-office hit.

Plot

A middle-aged man named Ananthan Thampy has made the decision never to get married in his life. He believes that marriage will cause him to lose his youth and masculinity. His main interests are bodybuilding and physique maintenance. Ananthan Thampy prefers to be a lifelong bachelor. Among his friends, Ananthan Thampi is referred to as "Thampi annan." The two steadfastly devoted assistants Rajappan and Varadappan stand by him and his principles even if they secretly want to wed their true loves.

His mother Subhadramma and father Shekharan Thampy constantly make sacrifices in temples in hopes that one day their son may reconsider and change his mind. As beneficiaries of Ananthan Thampy's considerable inheritance, his sister Nirmala and her husband Venugopalan Thampi (a.k.a. VVT) are delighted with Thampy's single status.

Ganga and her family move to the Thampi neighborhood. Vasumathi, an elderly teacher who arrives there on a transfer, rents a home by Shekharan Thampy. She has four daughters. Sindhu, the oldest, is already married, while the other three, Ganga, Yamuna, and Kaveri, live with their mother. When arriving at the rented house,  Ganga's family is unable to unload their furniture and other items from the lorry due to the local laborers demanding huge wages. To maintain Thampy's sister's pride, he had to unload all of Ganga's family's goods by himself.

One day, a man named Aravindan approaches Thampi and requests for a job at his cable firm. Thampi believes Aravindan to be Ganga's lover and offers to assist in arranging their nuptials. Confusions occur, and Thampy is forced to marry Ganga.

Cast
 Mohanlal as Ananthan Thampi / Thampi Annan/Thampi Aliyan
 Meena as Ganga
 Nedumudi Venu as Sekharan Thampi, Ananthan's father
 Jagathi Sreekumar as V. Venugopalan Thampi a.k.a. V. V. T. Anathan Thambi's brother-law
 Kaviyoor Ponnamma as Subhadramma, Ananthan's mother
 Devan as Raghavan
 Jagadish as Rajappan
 Sindhu Menon as Sevanthi
 Mohan Raj as Masthan Majeebhai
 Bindu Panikkar as Nirmala Anathan Thambi's Sister 
 Kalpana as Anasooya
 Prem Kumar as Varadappan
 Vijayakumar as Aravindan
 K. R. Vijaya as Vasumathi Ganga's mother 
 Jose Prakash as Sukumaran, Aravindan's father
 Rajasree Nair as Vimala as Sindhu
 Sruthi Nair (Devika Rani) as Yamuna
 Nivia Rebin as Kaveri
 Jagannatha Varma as Thirumeni
 Saju Kodiyan as Shokkalingam
 Kozhikode Narayanan Nair as Tea Shop Owner
 Sajan Palluruthy as Milk seller
 Krishna Prasad
 Bayilvan Ranganathan as Aashaan

Production
The film's shooting took place in Thenkasi, Tamil Nadu, and in shoranur, kerala.

Soundtrack
The film features songs composed by Mohan Sithara with lyrics by Girish Puthenchery. The soundtrack album was released by Manorama Music on 1 February 2003. The background score was composed by C. Rajamani.

Reception
The film was well received in theatres and was a commercial success at the box office. Made on a budget of ₹1.40 crore, the film earned more than ₹2.50 crore in distributor's share alone. The Telugu remake right of Mr. Brahmachari was bought by Chiranjeevi.

References

External links
 

2003 films
2003 comedy-drama films
2000s Malayalam-language films
Indian comedy-drama films
Films shot in Tirunelveli
Films shot in Palakkad
Films scored by Mohan Sithara
Films directed by Thulasidas
2003 comedy films
2003 drama films